The abbreviation CRRT may refer to

Cristopher Reuel Tolkien
Carrier Route mail sorting system for the United States Postal Service
Continuous renal replacement therapy
Chemical-Biological-Radiological Rapid Response Team
Commuter Rail Real Time data from the MBTA, providing train locations and arrival predictions for the MBTA Commuter Rail system
Cyber Rapid Response Team - EU countries (Lithuania, Estonia, Croatia, Poland, the Netherlands and Romania) cooperation in cyber area